Gerrit de Jager (born 1954, Amsterdam) is a Dutch cartoonist, creator of series such as , ,  and .

His career started in the early 1980s with Wim Stevenhagen under the pseudonym Prutspruts ("fiddle-fiddle"), which later changed to Prutswerk ("lousy job"). In the early stages he worked with the later Dutch musician Fay Lovsky. The first comic they brought out, titled De Ironische Man ("The Ironic Man") did not prove to be very successful, however the (now) duo went on producing comics such as Bert J. Prulleman and Pruts Pruts, Privat Kreye for the alternative magazine De Vrije Balloen. In this time the Familie Doorzon was born.

In 1984 the duo broke up, and Gerrit de Jager continued the familie Doorzon series, turning it into a huge success. His loose style, together with ruthless satire on the Dutch society gained the position of the most popular cartoonists.

Style and Satire
The success of De Familie Doorzon is largely due to the perfect satire on Dutch society and family life, with every majority and minority represented and no one spared. From the transvestite barkeeper (Rinus) to the dope peddling Ronnie D. and his voluptuous sister and her black husband, every nook and cranny of the Dutch welfare state (as personified by Emiel) and its workforce (the Biereco's) is mercilessly ridiculed.

Gerrit de Jager has a quite distinct style, characterized by a love for ridiculous situations, which frequently result in disaster. A good example of this is the inevitable falling over of buildings if the Biereco's (see illustration) had anything to do with it.

Although he is milder in his other comics, the common denominator is a good sense for the inevitable madness of social conventions.

Influence 

This is larger than one would expect for a "mere" comic artist. References to the Biereco's and verherbouwingen (They're specialized in "prereconstruction") are perfectly understood by nearly everyone younger than 40. Telling someone he reacts like Pa Doorzon amounts to more than just a little insult. His constant barrage of jokes on the combination of sex, politics and faith (and all the hypocrisy it takes to keep them aligned) has frequently acted as a monitor of everyday Dutch life, albeit through a distorting mirror.

De familie Doorzon - De Nieuwe Revu
Roel en zijn Beestenboel -- Jippo
Mik - Margriet
Liefde en Geluk -- Het Parool

Sources 
Nederlandse Stripgeschiedenis 
Ibid. 
Comiclopedia 

1954 births
Living people
Dutch comics artists
Dutch comics writers
Dutch humorists
Dutch satirists
Artists from Amsterdam
Winners of the Stripschapsprijs